Tavakkolabad (also romanized as Tavakkolābād; also known as Tavakolābād-e Pā’īn) is a village in Aliabad Rural District, in the Central District of Anbarabad County, Kerman Province, Iran. At the 2006 census, its population was 429, in 87 families.

References 

Populated places in Anbarabad County